Edward W. Hardy (born January 12, 1992) is an American composer, music director, violinist and violist. He is known as the composer, co-conceiver, music director, and violinist of the Off-Broadway show The Woodsman and is the owner of The Black Violin.

Life and career

Early life 

Hardy began studying the violin at the Opus 118 Music School in Harlem, New York at the age of 7, studying under the instruction of Roberta Guaspari, Lynelle Smith, Yonah Zur, and Elizabeth Handman. During this time, Hardy had numerous performances around the New York City area at locations including Avery Fisher Hall, Jazz at Lincoln Center, FiddleFest at The Apollo Theater, and Carnegie Hall where he shared the stage with Joshua Bell, Regina Carter, John Blake, Mark O'Connor, and Itzhak Perlman. Three years later, Hardy became a student of the Juilliard Music Advancement Program for young musicians. Later, he worked as a freelance concert artist for five years while studying both violin and viola at both Manhattan School of Music and the Bloomingdales School of Music. During the summer months, Hardy attended The Elisabeth Morrow School of Music, Manhattan School of Music Summer Camp, Kinhaven Music School and Green Mountain Chamber Music Festival. In 2012, Hardy also performed in a masterclass by Lawrence Dutton of the Emerson String Quartet.

Hardy found his love for theatre during his first undergraduate year at Purchase College. Although he was in the music conservatory, Hardy spent most of my time performing in plays presented by the acting conservatory. He composed for and performed in several plays, always in costume and on stage. By the end of his undergraduate career, Hardy fell in love with theater and with the idea of composing for theater.

Hardy often composed and performed for theatrical performances both on and off the Purchase College campus. He has performed in Three Sisters; Chekhov, Blues for an Alabama Sky; Cleage, Trojan Women; Euripides, Twelfth Night; Shakespeare, Mother Courage and Her Children; Brecht, Beautiful Dreamer; McElwaine/Foster,  all under the instruction of his mentor; James (Jim) McElwaine.

In 2015, Hardy was the recipient of the Beatrice Schacher-Myers Scholarship, 2014 and 2015 recipient of the Laurence Rosenfeld Scholarship, and the Chamber Music Live Scholarship from the Aaron Copland School of Music in 2015. He also performed in a masterclass with violinist Ida Kavafian at LeFrak Concert Hall in New York City. He was a student of Daniel Phillips of the Orion String Quartet Hardy earned his Masters of Music degree in Violin Performance with honors from CUNY, Queens College – Aaron Copland School of Music.

In 2021, Hardy moved from Harlem to Greeley in pursuit of a Doctor of Arts degree in violin performance from the University of Northern Colorado. He is a student of Dr. Jubal Fulks.

The Woodsman
In Hardy's junior year of 2012–13 at Purchase College, he started and finished composing all the music for the first edition of The Woodsman within two months. As each rendition of play developed and molded into something new the music reflected its transformation. Except for a brief introduction, The Woodsman does not have any words and is unlike any other play. During the first meeting with the playwright, both Hardy and Ortiz examined the synopsis of the play. This was Hardy's opportunity to think of this play like a silent film and tell a story through music. He explored different genres of music to create everything from the sound of nature to the different instruments in an orchestra. The program music plays a significant role in the play.”

Edgar Allan Poe's Inspired Works
Hardy composed “Three Pieces Inspired By Edgar Allan Poe”: Nevermore, Evil Eye and A Fantasy were recorded by Grammy award winner John Kilgore, Jonathan Jetter and produced by Jim McElwaine. Nevermore was premiered at Hardy's first one-man sold-out show “Six Violins: A Musical Evening with Edward W. Hardy” at the Cutting Room in NYC which also featured Hardy playing three his violins on WNYW - Fox 5 news.

Works

Unaccompanied solo violin
Sources: Music by Black Composers (MBC, Rachel Barton Pine), Musical Stories.
 Nick Chopper (2012, published 2022)
 Nimme and the Wicked Witch of the East (2012, published 2022)
 The Kalidah (2012, published 2022)
 Nick Chopper & Nimmie Amee (2012, published 2022)
 Finding Love (2012, published 2022)
 Dorothy Arrives (2012, published 2022)
 The Lovers Dance (2016)
 Ship at Sea (2016)
 Making the Perfect Dress (2017)
 Odette and Siegfried’s First Dance (2017)
 Swans at the Shore (2017)
 Nevermore from Three Pieces Inspired by Edgar Allan Poe (2018)
 Evolution - Inspired by the evolution of Black Music (2019)
 Mama, now I can breathe (2020)

Instrumental chamber music
 Tinkers, percussion and solo violin (2012, published 2022)
 Strange Fruit, arrangement for string quartet (2020)
 Flying (Dancing in Spanish Harlem), for Latin ensemble (2018)
 Flying (Dancing in Spanish Harlem), for string quartet (2018)
 Evil Eye (from Three Pieces Inspired by Edgar Allan Poe), for string quartet (2018)
 A Fantasy (from Three Pieces Inspired by Edgar Allan Poe), for string quartet (2018)

Voice and solo violin
 Cerulean Sky (Prologue), for choir and solo violin (2012, published 2022)
 Whispering Munchkins-Dark Woods, for choir, solo voice and solo violin (2012, published 2022)
 Forever Yours, for soprano, tenor and solo violin (2012, published 2022)
 My Heart Is Gone, for soprano and solo violin (2012, published 2022)
 Rusting Tin Man, for lead tenor, soprano, tenor, solo violin and choir (2012, published 2022)

Song cycles
 BORN FREE - Sorrow Home, Lineage, The Struggle Staggers Us and Southern Song, for soprano, violin and piano (2022)

Solo harp
 Alone (2020)

Plays
 Dream Chaser, play with music (2019)

Television

Discography

Soundtracks and Original Cast Recordings

Singles

References

Further reading 
 Hoy, William. 2021. A recording of solo violin repertoire by black composers throughout history: Commentary and pedagogical observations. Ph.D. diss., University of Georgia.

External links

Official Website

 
1992 births
Living people
Musicians from New York City
Jazz musicians from New York (state)
Writers from New York City
American classical composers
American classical violinists
American multi-instrumentalists
American music arrangers
American male classical composers
American music educators
American music publishers (people)
American songwriters
American male dramatists and playwrights
American musical theatre composers
American people of African descent
American people of Puerto Rican descent
American male jazz musicians
African-American classical composers
African-American male classical composers
African-American music educators
African-American songwriters
African-American jazz musicians
Jazz-influenced classical composers
Light music composers
Male classical violinists
Male musical theatre composers
Organization founders
Violin pedagogues
Queens College, City University of New York alumni
State University of New York at Purchase alumni
University of Northern Colorado alumni
20th-century American violinists
21st-century American violinists
20th-century American male musicians
21st-century American male musicians
21st-century American male writers
20th-century classical violinists
21st-century classical violinists
21st-century American male actors
21st-century American dramatists and playwrights